Quayvon Hicks (born July 17, 1994) is an American football running back who is a free agent. He played college football at Georgia.

Professional career 

Hicks was signed by the Tampa Bay Buccaneers on January 10, 2017. He was waived on August 20, 2017. On October 10, 2017, Hicks signed with the Columbus Lions.

Massachusetts Pirates
Hicks signed with the Massachusetts Pirates of the National Arena League for the 2019 season. Hicks had 39 carries for 155 yards and 1 reception for 7 yards, while producing 6 tds.

References

External links 
 Tampa Bay Buccaneers bio

1994 births
Living people
People from Blackshear, Georgia
Players of American football from Georgia (U.S. state)
American football running backs
Georgia Bulldogs football players
Tampa Bay Buccaneers players
Columbus Lions players